The Central Philippines State University, also referred to by its acronym CPSU, is a public higher education institution in the Philippines. Its main campus is located in Kabankalan, Negros Occidental and has 9 other satellite campuses in different cities and municipalities in the province.

History
CPSU started as Negros Occidental Agricultural School (NONAS) and was dubbed as the 1st Agricultural Institution in the country established by a Filipino Superintendent named Jose F. Crisanto immediately after World War II in 1946.

The institution was converted to Negros Occidental Agricultural College (NOAC) by virtue of Presidential Authority on September 6, 1977. NOAC then was converted into state college known as the Negros State College of Agriculture (NSCA) by virtue of R.A. 9141 date July 3, 2001.

By virtue of the Republic Act (R.A.) 10228, NSCA was converted to Central Philippines State University in 2012.

Academics
CPSU has nine colleges:

 College of Agriculture
 College of Animal Science
 College of Forestry
 College of Teacher Education
 College of Arts and Sciences
 College of Business Education
 College of Engineering
 College of Computer Studies
 College of Criminal Justice Education

The university also offers graduate studies leading to a master's degree and a doctorate degree.

References

External links
 CPSU official site
 

State universities and colleges in the Philippines
Universities and colleges in Negros Occidental